Larochea miranda is an extremely minute species of sea snail, a marine gastropod mollusc or micromollusc in the family Larocheidae.

Distribution
This marine species occurs off New Zealand.

References
 Powell A. W. B., New Zealand Mollusca, William Collins Publishers Ltd, Auckland, New Zealand 1979 
 Geiger D.L. (2012) Monograph of the little slit shells. Volume 1. Introduction, Scissurellidae. pp. 1-728. Volume 2. Anatomidae, Larocheidae, Depressizonidae, Sutilizonidae, Temnocinclidae. pp. 729–1291. Santa Barbara Museum of Natural History Monographs Number 7

Larocheidae
Gastropods of New Zealand
Gastropods described in 1927
Taxa named by Harold John Finlay